USS Harvey C. Barnum Jr. (DDG-124) is a planned United States Navy  Flight IIA guided missile destroyer, the 74th overall for the class. She was named in honor of Harvey C. Barnum Jr., a retired United States Marine Corps officer who received the Medal of Honor for valor during the Vietnam War. Colonel Barnum served as Deputy Assistant Secretary of the Navy (Reserve Affairs) and as Acting Assistant Secretary of the Navy (Manpower and Reserve Affairs). In a press release from General Dynamics, the parent company of Bath Iron Works, it was announced that the United States Navy has awarded funding for the planning and construction of DDG-124, for the Fiscal Year 2016. The $644.3 million contract modification fully funds this ship, and was awarded as part of a multi-year competition for Arleigh Burke-class destroyers awarded in 2013. Harvey C. Barnum Jr. is expected to be commissioned in 2024.

References

 

Proposed ships of the United States Navy
Arleigh Burke-class destroyers